JFC is a reggae, calypso, and soca band based in Arlington, Virginia in the Northern Virginia / Washington, D.C. area. Starting as an active band in 2005, their music is produced independently.

Biography
JFC is a multi-cultural roots reggae/soca/calypso band with members from Jamaica, Trinidad and Tobago, and the USA. Fronted by Trinidad’s Stephen Samuel (Prime Minister’s Cultural Entourage), JFC plays Caribbean dance rhythms, writing songs with positive messages.

Stephen Samuel began his musical career in his homeland of Trinidad circa 1960, playing soca & calypso. He was a mainstay in the showcase Calypso tents at Trinidad and Tobago Carnival in the 1970s - 1980s. Throughout the 1980s-1990s, Samuel fronted reggae & caribbean bands for the Carnival Cruise Lines.

In 2005, after a hiatus from music, Samuel formed the band JFC, attracting local musicians Earl Carter (Marcus Johnson, Experience Unlimited, P. Diddy), and Glenn Arnett (Peaches & Herb). 2008 saw the addition of African drum teacher David McDavitt(Chopteeth), and bassist Englishman (Itals, Ras Michael's Sons of Negus, Shango Band). In 2010 guitarist Robin Armstrong (Culture), and saxophonist Trevor Specht (Chopteeth), joined JFC. In 2011 keyboardist Worrel "Kango" David (Passion Reggaem TR7, DKGB, Heat Wave) joined JFC.

Members
 Stephen Samuel (lead vocals)
 Worrel "Kango" David(keyboard)
 Robin Armstrong (guitar/vocals)
 David McDavitt (drums/percussion/vocals)
 Erald "Englishman" Briscoe (bass/vocals)
 Trevor Specht (saxophone)

Discography
 Barack Obama (song & video) (2008)
 "Last Days" Dec 2008 tba
 Tata (Sam'O solo)] (2004)

See also
 Mighty Sparrow
 Bob Marley
 SOJA

References
 Official Website
 Englishman & Shango Band

External links
 Interview with Arious Entertainment

Musical groups from Washington, D.C.
American reggae musical groups